Stockholm City Centre (Stockholms innerstad, Innerstaden, Inre staden) is in Stockholm Municipality, also known as the City of Stockholm, part of the Stockholm urban area in Sweden.

Since 2007, Stockholm City Centre has been organized into four stadsdelsområden (sometimes translated as "boroughs"): Kungsholmen, Södermalm, Norrmalm and Östermalm. Before 2007, it was organized into five boroughs: Katarina-Sofia borough, Kungsholmen borough, Maria-Gamla stan borough, Norrmalm borough and Östermalm borough.

The border between the historical provinces of Södermanland and Uppland splits Stockholm City Centre in two parts. 179,185 people live on an area of 28.05 km2 in the northern (Uppland) part, which gives a density of 6,388.06/km2. The same data for the southern (Södermanland) part is 103,646 people on 7.44 km2, giving a density of 13,930.91/km2. This border is purely historical and has no administrative significance.

Districts

See also
South Stockholm
West Stockholm
Stockholm City Station

References

Geography of Stockholm
Central business districts
Economy of Stockholm